Ptychodactis patula is a species of sea anemone. It occurs in the Arctic and northern Atlantic oceans.

References

Ptychodactinidae
Animals described in 1893